Jack Baldwin may refer to:

Sir Jack Baldwin (chemist) (1938–2020), British chemist
Jack Baldwin (footballer) (born 1993), English footballer for Bristol Rovers
Sir Jack Baldwin (RAF officer) (1892–1975)
Jack Baldwin (racing driver) (born 1948), American racing driver
Jack Baldwin (American football) (1921–1989)

See also
John Baldwin (disambiguation)